Facundo Pumpido (born 21 October 1988) is an Argentinian footballer who plays for Temperley as a forward.

Club career
Born in Olivos, Buenos Aires, Pumpido did not appear for any youth setups due to his studying responsibilities. His first senior club was Tigre, in Primera División.

Pumpido made his professional debut on 16 May 2009, coming on as a late substitute for Carlos Luna in a 2–1 home win against Colón; it was his maiden appearance for the club. He subsequently moved to Primera B Nacional side Independiente Rivadavia, scoring his first professional goal while at the club.

In 2011 Pumpido joined Huracán de Tres Arroyos in Torneo Argentino A, after being rarely used. On 5 January of the following year he agreed to a contract at Acassuso in Primera B Metropolitana, being a regular starter during his time at the club.

On 24 January 2015 Pumpido was loaned to San Martín de San Juan in the top tier, for one year. On 7 January of the following year he moved abroad for the first time in his career, after agreeing to a six-month deal with Spanish Segunda División B side Racing de Santander.

Personal life
Pumpido's uncle, Nery was also a footballer: a goalkeeper, he was an international with Argentina on more than 30 occasions.

References

External links
 
 
 
 
 
 

1988 births
Living people
Sportspeople from Buenos Aires Province
Argentine footballers
Argentine expatriate footballers
Association football forwards
Argentine Primera División players
Primera Nacional players
Club Atlético Tigre footballers
Independiente Rivadavia footballers
Huracán de Tres Arroyos footballers
Club Atlético Acassuso footballers
San Martín de San Juan footballers
Nueva Chicago footballers
Club Atlético Brown footballers
Deportivo Morón footballers
Guillermo Brown footballers
Segunda División B players
Racing de Santander players
Club Comunicaciones footballers
Club Atlético Temperley footballers
Argentine expatriate sportspeople in Spain
Expatriate footballers in Spain